Jabalpur (Station Code: JBP), is a railway station of Jabalpur City in Madhya Pradesh. Jabalpur city is the Headquarters of West Central Railway.

See also
 Madan Mahal railway station

References

External links

Railway junction stations in Madhya Pradesh
Jabalpur railway division
Transport in Jabalpur
Railway stations in Jabalpur district
Buildings and structures in Jabalpur